Francesco Ferrini (born 29 January 1985) is an Italian footballer who plays for Civitanovese.

Biography
Born in Classe, a neighbourhood of Ravenna, Romagna region, Ferrini started his professional career at Forlì. In 2005, he returned to Cesena, where he spent  Serie B seasons.

In January 2007 he was signed by Perugia. in summer 2007 he left for Sambenedettese. Soon after the co-ownership deal with Cesena was resolved in June 2009, in summer 2009 he left for Pavia.

In 2011, he was signed by Spezia in 2-year contract. On 7 August 2012 he returned to Pavia. In 2013, he was signed by Alessandria. In January 2014 he was swapped with Massimiliano Sampaolesi. Ferrini returned to Alessandria on 1 July 2014. However, he was released on 28 August 2014.

On 30 August 2014 he was signed by Serie D club Civitanovese.

References

External links
 AIC profile (data by football.it) 

Italian footballers
A.C. Cesena players
A.C. Perugia Calcio players
A.S. Sambenedettese players
F.C. Pavia players
Spezia Calcio players
U.S. Alessandria Calcio 1912 players
Serie B players
Serie C players
Association football midfielders
Sportspeople from Ravenna
1985 births
Living people
Footballers from Emilia-Romagna